Gloucester Park may refer to:
Gloucester Park, Perth, harness racing and cricket venue in Perth, Western Australia
Gloucester Park, Gloucester, public park in Gloucestershire, England
Gloucester Park, Basildon, public park in Essex, England
Te Hopua a Rangi, volcano in Auckland, New Zealand
Gloucester National Park south of Perth, Western Australia
Gloucester Business Park, in Gloucester, England